Warming Up is a 1928 American baseball film starring Richard Dix and Jean Arthur, directed by Fred C. Newmeyer, and released by Paramount Pictures in the Movietone sound system as Paramount's first sound film.

The film was released in a silent version and a sound version. The sound version had synchronized music and sound effects without dialogue.

The film featured several major league baseball players as themselves.

Cast
Richard Dix as Bert Tulliver
Jean Arthur as Mary Post
Claude King as Mr. Post
Philo McCullough as McRae
Billy Kent Schaefer as Edsel
Roscoe Karns as Hippo
James Dugan as Brill
Mike Donlin as Veteran Baseball Player / Himself
Mike Ready	as Himself
Chet Thomas as himself
Joe Pirrone as himself
Wally Hood as himself
Bob Murray as himself
Truck Hannah as himself
Wade Boteler as Bit Part (uncredited)

Plot
Bert Tulliver (Dix), a pitcher for a baseball team in a small town, is given the opportunity to try out for a team in the big leagues. Unfortunately, he incurs the enmity of McRae (McCullough), the league's leading home-run hitter. In addition, Bert falls for the team owner's daughter Mary (Arthur), who McRae has designs on.

Preservation status
This film is now considered a lost film, with no prints known to survive.

See also
List of lost films
Movietone sound system

References

External links

Still at silenthollywood.com

1928 films
1920s sports films
Paramount Pictures films
American baseball films
Films directed by Fred C. Newmeyer
Lost American films
American black-and-white films
1928 lost films
Lost sports films
1920s American films
1920s English-language films
Silent sports films